Camptolepis is a genus of plant in family Sapindaceae. It contains the following species (but this list may be incomplete):

Camptolepis crassifolia Capuron
Camptolepis grandiflora Capuron
Camptolepis hygrophila Capuron
Camptolepis ramiflora (Taub.) Radlk.

 
Sapindaceae genera
Taxonomy articles created by Polbot